West Thornton is a ward in the London Borough of Croydon, covering part of the Thornton Heath area. The first election held under the new ward boundaries was the 2018 Croydon Council election.

List of Councillors

Mayoral election results 
Below are the results for the candidate which received the highest share of the popular vote in the ward at each mayoral election.

Ward Results 

The by-election was triggered by the resignation of Councillor Emily Benn to pursue a job in New York City, United States

References 

Wards of the London Borough of Croydon